Kim Sang-jin (Korean: 김상진; born February 15, 1967) is a former South Korean footballer who played as a forward.

He started professional career at FC Seoul then known as Lucky-Goldstar FC in 1990 and he transferred to Bucheon SK in 1995.

He was squad of South Korea Universiade team in 1987 Summer Universiade.

References

External links 
 

1967 births
Living people
Association football forwards
FC Seoul players
Jeju United FC players
K League 1 players
South Korean footballers
Hanyang University alumni
Asian Games silver medalists for South Korea
Asian Games medalists in football
Footballers at the 1958 Asian Games
Medalists at the 1958 Asian Games